is a passenger railway station in located in the town of Meiwa, Taki District, Mie Prefecture, Japan, operated by the private railway operator Kintetsu Railway. The station has the Inspection Center for the Yamada Line, the Toba Line and the Shima Line.

Lines
Myōjō Station is served by the Yamada Line, and is located 19.8 rail kilometers from the terminus of the line at Ise-Nakagawa Station.

Station layout
The station was consists of two island platforms connected by a level crossing, serving 2 tracks each. Tracks (Platforms) 2 and 4 are main tracks and Tracks (Platforms) 1 and 3 are refuge tracks to allow for the passage of express trains.

Platforms

The first train for Ise-Nakagawa (through to Nabari on the Osaka Line) departs from Track (Platform) 1.

Adjacent stations

History
Myōjō Station opened on March 27, 1930 as a station on the Sangu Kyuko Electric Railway. On March 15, 1941, the line merged with Osaka Electric Railway to become a station on Kansai Kyuko Railway's Yamada Line. This line in turn was merged with the Nankai Electric Railway on June 1, 1944 to form Kintetsu.

Passenger statistics
In fiscal 2019, the station was used by an average of 646 passengers daily (boarding passengers only).

Surrounding area
Kintetsu Myōjō Train Inspection Center
Myojo Elementary School
Mizuike Pottery Kiln ruins

References

External links

Kintetsu: Myōjō Station 

Railway stations in Japan opened in 1930
Railway stations in Mie Prefecture
Stations of Kintetsu Railway
Meiwa, Mie